Luigi Andreas Mariano Acquaviva (20 December 1812 – 29 September 1898) was an Italian politician and general. He was born in Naples to a noble family of the Kingdom of Two Sicilies. He inherited the title of duke of Atri from his father Girolamo. He also the received the title of duke of Nardò, count of Conversano, Castellana Grotte and Giulianova. He served in the Senate of the Kingdom of Sardinia. He was a grand officer of the Order of Saints Maurice and Lazarus. He died in Giulianova.

References

1812 births
1898 deaths
19th-century Italian politicians
19th-century Neapolitan people
Italian generals
Members of the Senate of the Kingdom of Sardinia
Grand Officers of the Order of Saints Maurice and Lazarus